Antonio (Rodriguez) Noguera (born February 26, 1988) is a  professional baseball player, who is  with Nettuno Baseball City of the Italian Baseball League.

He was born in Venezuela and signed as an amateur free agent by the Houston Astros in 2005 and started his career with their Venezuelan Summer League team. After playing in the Astros low minors through 2009 he was released. He played in Spain for the Marins Puerto Cruz in 2010 and played in Italy for the  Novara United in 2011–2012.

He played for the Spain national baseball team in the  2009 Baseball World Cup, 2010 European Championship, 2013 World Baseball Classic, and the 2019 European Baseball Championship. He then played for the team at the Africa/Europe 2020 Olympic Qualification tournament, in Italy in September 2019.

References

External links

1988 births
Baseball pitchers
Living people
2013 World Baseball Classic players
2019 European Baseball Championship players
Greeneville Astros players
Tri-City ValleyCats players
Lexington Legends players
Leones del Caracas players
Novara United players
Tiburones de La Guaira players
Unipol Bologna players
Venezuelan Summer League Astros players
Venezuelan expatriate baseball players in Italy
Venezuelan expatriate baseball players in Mexico
Venezuelan expatriate baseball players in the United States